Muniswamappa Krishnappa is an Indian politician from the state of Karnataka.

Early life 
He is the son of Muniswamappa. He earned a B. Sc. Graduation in 1973 from Sri Jagadguru Renukacharya College, affiliated to Bangalore University. He was a Senate Member at Rajiv Gandhi the University of Health Science, Karnataka. 
Before entering politics, he worked in real estate and land development. He is an ex-member of the Southern Railway Board Committee and Bangalore Telecommunications District Advisory Committee.

Career 
He served as a member of Karnataka Legislative Council from 2000 to 2006. He entered the political arena through Indian National Congress and contested as Indian National Congress candidate for Bangalore South Parliament Constituency in the 2004 General Elections.

He is an All India Congress Committee (AICC) Member and KPCC Treasurer.

In 2008 he was appointed Member of Karnataka Legislative Assembly for Vijayanagar Constituency, Bangalore. He is serving as MLA for Third Consecutive Term from Vijayanagar Assembly Constituency.

He served as the Minister of Housing in Government of Karnataka and was also appointed Mandya District In-Charge minister in October 2016, preceded by Sandalwood film star turned politician M. H. Ambareesh. He proposed the One Lakh Housing Scheme as Minister for Housing under Siddaramaiah as Chief Minister of Karnataka.

He represents the Vijay Nagar assembly constituency, located in south Bangalore as a member of Indian National Congress.

He has 2 criminal cases against him.

References

External links
 website
Karnataka Legislative Assembly

Living people
Karnataka MLAs 2013–2018
Indian National Congress politicians from Karnataka
1953 births
Karnataka politicians
Karnataka MLAs 2018–2023
Karnataka MLAs 2008–2013